Sterling is a town in Windham County, Connecticut, United States. The population was 3,578 at the 2020 census.

History
The town was named after John Sterling, an early settler. Sterling was incorporated in 1794 following approval of the state Assembly and was carved from northern part of the Town of Voluntown. Le Comte de Rochambeau, Jean Baptiste Donatien de Vimeur, marched through and camped in the town during the American Revolutionary War on his way from landing at Narragansett Bay to join George Washington's forces on the Hudson River in 1781. A cotton mill was first established in Sterling in 1800.

Charles Dow, of Dow Jones fame, was born in this community.

Geography

Demographics

As of the census of 2000, there were 3,099 people, 1,116 households, and 835 families living in the town. Sterling's population increased 23.6% between 2000 and 2010, making it the third fastest-growing municipality in Connecticut that decade. The racial makeup of the town was 99.19% White, 0.71% Native American, 0.32% Asian, 0.03% Pacific Islander, 0.16% from other races, and 2.42% from two or more races. Hispanic or Latino of any race were 1.32% of the population.

There were 1,116 households, out of which 40.2% had children under the age of 18 living with them, 60.7% were married couples living together, 8.4% had a female householder with no husband present, and 25.1% were non-families. 18.1% of all households were made up of individuals, and 5.6% had someone living alone who was 65 years of age or older. The average household size was 2.78 and the average family size was 3.15.

In the town, the population was spread out, with 28.1% under the age of 18, 7.6% from 18 to 24, 36.4% from 25 to 44, 20.4% from 45 to 64, and 7.5% who were 65 years of age or older. The median age was 34 years. For every 100 females, there were 104.6 males. For every 100 females age 18 and over, there were 107.2 males.

The median income for a household in the town was $49,167, and the median income for a family was $52,202. Males had a median income of $39,792 versus $26,167 for females. The per capita income for the town was $19,679. About 3.8% of families and 6.0% of the population were below the poverty line, including 4.3% of those under age 18 and 1.3% of those age 65 or over.

Notable locations
Dorrance Inn is a historic inn located at 748 Plainfield Pike and was added to the National Register of Historic Places in 2002.
March Route of Rochambeau's Army: Plainfield Pike
Sterling Hill Historic District (Plainfield and Sterling, Connecticut) was added to the National Register in 1986.

Education
The town operates the newer Sterling Community School after the construction and closure of Sterling Memorial School. Plainfield High School in Plainfield is the designated high school of the town. Residents are also given the option to send their children to Killingly High School, Harvard H. Ellis Technical High School, Quinebaug Middle College or ACT High School. .

Notable people

 Charles Dow (1851–1902), journalist and founder of the Dow Jones & Company was born in Sterling
 Allen Cleveland Lewis (1821–1877), founder of the Lewis Institute (later the Illinois Institute of Technology) was born in Sterling
 Tom "T-Bone" Stankus, musician

References

External links

Town government Web site

 
Towns in Windham County, Connecticut
Towns in Connecticut